Tropical Storm Koguma was a weak tropical cyclone that made landfall in Vietnam, causing minor damage. The fourth named storm of the 2021 Pacific typhoon season, the system was first noted as an area of persistent convection on the South China Sea on June 10, with the JTWC assessing the system in its first advisory as a monsoon depression. Tracking west-northwestward, marginally conductive environmental conditions in the area allowed slight intensification while drifting towards Hainan Island. On the next day, the JMA upgraded the system to a tropical depression as it passed to the south of the territory before the agency upgraded the system to a tropical storm on June 12, being assigned the name Koguma. The JTWC; however still treated the system as a tropical depression until 12:00 UTC that day. It continued to move northwest over the warm waters of the Gulf of Tonkin, eventually making landfall in Vietnam over Thanh Hóa by the end of the same day, rapidly weakening afterward. 

Koguma caused widespread floods in Vietnam and Laos, being influenced by the prevailing southwest monsoon. Trees and electrical lines in the former were downed by strong winds, while numerous landslides and rivers being overflowed due to rains were confirmed in the latter. Two individuals in Thanh Hóa were reported to be missing due to the storm, while an individual in Yên Bái Province was confirmed dead by the Vietnam Disaster Management Authority, though their exact cause of death is unknown. Preliminary damages at An Vũ, Haiphong were at 2.4 billion đồng (US$104,000) while in Xayaboury stood at ₭94 billion (US$9.77 million).

Meteorological history 

At 06:00 UTC on June 11, the Japan Meteorological Agency (JMA) upgraded the system into a tropical depression in its first advisory. An anticyclone over China started to move eastward at this time, increasing the divergent flow on the area which allowed slight intensification of the system. The JTWC issued a Tropical Cyclone Formation Alert (TCFA) for the system, six hours later despite remaining disorganized on satellite imagery. At 03:00 UTC on June 12, the JTWC upgraded the system into a tropical depression, assigning it the designation 05W. At this time, the system passed over southern Hainan Island, into an area of moderate wind shear, which hampered the system's intensification. Three hours later at 06:00 UTC, the JMA assessed the system to had strengthened to a tropical storm, being assigned the name Koguma. Six hours later, the JTWC upgraded the system to the same intensity as well as it entered the Gulf of Tonkin. Remaining weak, Koguma moved northwestward and subsequently made landfall over north-central Thanh Hóa at 18:00 UTC on the same day, at peak intensity with winds of 65 km/h (40 mph) and a barometric pressure of 996 mbar. The JTWC issued their final warning on the weakening system shortly afterward. At 15:45 UTC on June 13, the JMA also issued the final warning on Koguma as it weakened further to a tropical depression and subsequently dissipated over the terrains of Vietnam.

Preparations

Vietnam 
As Koguma approached Vietnam from the Gulf of Tonkin, the city of Thái Bình ordered the suspension of fishing activities in the area due to the forecasted rough waters from the storm. Many farmers in the place also hurried to harvest the spring rice crops to prevent them from being destroyed and flooded. The People's Committee of the city, on the other hand, urged the individuals in the area to cut the trees that would disrupt major roadways and put support on their houses, warehouses, schools, hospitals, aquaculture and fishing farms to prevent any damages. Evacuations in the area and its nearby cities and provinces were also ordered. Moderate to heavy rainfall were also expected in the northern portions of the country, with 50-120 mm (2 - 4 in) of rain being forecasted in these areas, including Hanoi. In addition, the country's capital also prepared a flood response plan inland and informed 54,673 vehicles in the sea of possible impacts from Koguma.

Elsewhere 
At 13:00 UTC on June 11, the Hong Kong Observatory in Hong Kong issued a Signal Number 1 in the region due to Koguma, which was subsequently cancelled on 16:30 UTC, the next day. The Ministry of Water Resources in Cambodia raised an alert warning on the country due to the possible effects of Koguma, being influenced by the prevailing southwest monsoon. The ministry also advised fishermen across the country to be alerted of large waves, gusty winds, and prevalent thunderstorms. Authorities in Laos informed the people in the country to be alert on floods caused by the prevailing monsoon and the remnants of Koguma. The Thai Meteorological Department noted that moderate to heavy rainfall were expected across some places in Northern and Northeastern portions of Thailand due to the influence of the monsoon trough and the remnants of the system.

Impact

Vietnam 

A tornado swept through An Vu commune in the rural district of Quỳnh Phụ District on June 13, causing the roofs of some schools in the area to be blown away by strong winds. These conditions also caused several trees in the district and in Haiphong to be uprooted while four power poles in the former had been reported to be depleted due to the storm. In the latter, heavy rains from Koguma caused many rivers to nearly overflow. Initial impacts caused by the storm in An Vũ topped at 2.4 billion đồng (US$104,000). 2 people in Thanh Hóa's coast were reported missing, while an individual was confirmed dead in Yên Bái Province on June 14 by the Vietnam Disaster Management Authority due to Koguma. A total of 143 houses throughout Vietnam were damaged. Over 19,720 hectares of farmland were also submerged in floodwaters while 850 individuals throughout the country were affected due to the storm.

Laos 
Despite Koguma dissipating over Vietnam, the remnants of the storm reached Laos, causing numerous landslides and floods. Residences and farmlands were the worst impacted in Vientiane, Xayaboury, Xiangkhouang and Bokeo due to the storm, being influenced further by the monsoon. Houses in Pha Oudom District, located in Bokeo Province were reported to be washed away by the floodwaters while several landslides disrupted roadways in Xiengkhouang's Khoune District. Local authorities in the country also issued warnings on individuals residing in different rivers across the country due to the rising water levels.  In addition, the Nam Houng River and Nam Song River overflowed on June 14, with the former flooding the ricefields near the watercourse. Over 3,000 individuals in Sainyabuli, on the other hand, were affected by the floods. The damages in the country are still tallied as of June 16. 5,300 public vehicles and 11 schools were reported to be damaged by the floods, while five bridges throughout the country were wrecked. In addition, 25 roadways were impassable as they were destroyed; some of them were now repaired as of June 17. An estimated 169 hectares of plowland were severely affected by the floods and an unknown number of poultry and cattle perished due to the storm. No deaths were confirmed in the country and the damages in Xayaboury, the worst hit, stood at ₭94 billion (US$9.77 million).

Notes

See also 

 Weather of 2021
 Tropical cyclones in 2021
 Tropical Storm Zita (1997) – A short-lived tropical cyclone that killed seven people throughout southern China in August 1997.
 Tropical Storm Bebinca (2013) – A tropical cyclone brought minor damage in China and Vietnam, causing a death.
 Tropical Storm Sinlaku (2020) –  A weak but deadly tropical cyclone that impacted Vietnam, Thailand and Laos in August 2020.
 Tropical Storm Nangka (2020) –  the 4th wettest tropical cyclone on record.

References

External links 

JMA General Information of Tropical Storm Koguma (2104) from Digital Typhoon
JMA Best Track Data of Tropical Storm Koguma (2104) (Date Released August 28)
JMA Best Track Data (Graphics) of Tropical Storm Koguma (2104)
JTWC Best Track Data of Tropical Storm 05W (Koguma)
05W.KOGUMA from the U.S. Naval Research Laboratory

2021 Pacific typhoon season
Tropical cyclones in 2021
Typhoons in China
June 2021 events in Asia
Typhoons in Vietnam
Western Pacific tropical storms
2021 in Vietnam
2021 disasters in China
Typhoons in Laos
2021 in Laos
2021 in Thailand
2021 in Cambodia
2021 in Hong Kong
Typhoons in Thailand
2021 disasters in Asia